Galumna pseudokhoii is a species of mite first found in Cát Tiên National Park, Vietnam, in dark loam in a Lagerstroemia forest. This species is very similar in the location and morphology of notogastral areae porosae, rostral morphology, lamellar and interlamellar setae, lamellar lines locations, and incomplete dorsosejugal suture to Galumna khoii, differing in body size, sensilli morphology, and the number of genital setae on the anterior parts of its genital plates.

References

Further reading
Ermilov, Sergey, and Alexander E. Anichkin. "Oribatid mites (Acari: Oribatida) of fungi from Dong Nai Biosphere Reserve, Southern Vietnam."Persian Journal of Acarology 2.2 (2013).
Ermilov, SERGEY G., ALEXANDER E. Anichkin, and D. O. N. G. H. U. I. Wu. "Oribatid mites from Bu Gia Map National Park (Southern Vietnam), with description of a new species of Dolicheremaeus (Tetracondylidae)(Acari: Oribatida)." Genus 23.4 (2012): 591-601.

Sarcoptiformes
Arthropods of Vietnam